River of Light is a ballet made by New York City Ballet balletmaster in chief Peter Martins to eponymous music by Charles Wuorinen commissioned in honor of his sixtieth birthday. The premiere took place June 11, 1998, at the New York State Theater, Lincoln Center, with costumes by Holly Hynes and lighting by Mark Stanley; the 2008 revival was conducted by the composer and held in honor of his seventieth birthday. The River of Light was the third work in a trio of scores the New York City Ballet commissioned from Wuorinen in the early 1990s, the others being The Mission of Virgil and The Great Procession.  All three works refer to scenes in Dante's Divine Comedy.

Original cast
Darci Kistler
Monique Meunier
Alexandra Ansanelli
Jock Soto
Charles Askegard
Sébastien Marcovici

References 
Repertory Week, New York City Ballet, Spring Season, 2008 repertory, week 5
Playbill, New York City Ballet, Thursday, May 29, 2008

Reviews 
NY Times review by Alastair Macaulay, May 31, 2008
NY Times review by Anna Kisselgoff, June 18, 1999
NY Times review by Jennifer Dunning, June 13, 1998

Ballets by Peter Martins
Ballets by Charles Wuorinen
New York City Ballet repertory
1998 ballet premieres
Ballets designed by Holly Hynes
Serial compositions